The 2001 Ms. Olympia contest 
is an IFBB professional bodybuilding competition and part of Joe Weider's Olympia Fitness & Performance Weekend 2001 was held on October 26, 2001, at the Mandalay Bay Arena in Paradise, Nevada. It was the 22nd Ms. Olympia competition held. Other events at the exhibition include the Mr. Olympia and Fitness Olympia contests.

Prize money

Overall - $10,000
1st (LW) - $10,000
2nd (LW) - $6,000
3rd (LW) - $4,000
1st (HW) - $10,000
2nd (HW) - $6,000
3rd (HW) - $4,000

Total: $50,000

Call outs

Individual posing

 Dayana Cadeau: Posing songs - Differences / Family Affair
 Renee Casella: Posing song - We Are
 Juliette Bergmann: Posing song - I've Never Been to Me
 Joanna Thomas: Posing song - I Ask of You
 Kim Harris: Posing song - Dance with Me
 Brenda Raganot: Posing song - Bootylicious
 Gayle Moher: Posing song - Desert Rose
 Angela Debatin: Posing song - Genie in a Bottle
 Fannie Barrios: Posing songs - You Can Leave Your Hat On / 20th Century Fox Fanfare / Soul Bossa Nova / Bootylicious / Lady Marmalade 
 Andrulla Blanchette: Posing songs - War / The Greatest Love of All
 Vickie Gates: Posing songs - Slowly / One Minute Man / Lady Marmalade
 Lesa Lewis: Posing songs - Bad Boy for Life
 Betty Pariso: Posing song - To Love You More
 Valentina Chepiga: Posing song - 
 Yaxeni Oriquen: Posing song - Fallin'
 Iris Kyle: Next Generation

Prejudging posing

Call Outs from Round One: Lightweights

 Cadeau - Blachette - Bergman
 Raganot - Blachette - Moher
 Casella - Raganot - Harris
 Debatin - Barios - Thomas
 Bergman - Harris - Blanchette
 Casella - Debatin - Thomas
 Raganot - Moher - Harris
 Barrios - Moher - Cadeau
 Harris - Moher - Casella
 Bergman - Blachette
 Cadaeu - Bergman - Blanchette

Call Outs from Round Two: Lightweights

 Cadeau - Blachette - Bergman
 Casella - Cadeau - Raganot
 Casella - Moher - Barrios
 Thomas - Harris - Debatin
 Debatin - Raganot - Moher

Call Outs from Round One: Heavyweights

 Chepiga - Gates - Lewis
 Kyle - Oriquen - Lewis
 Foster - Pariso - Lewis
 Gates - Oriquen - Kyle
 
Call Outs from Round Two: Heavyweights

 Oriquen - Gates - Kyle
 Lewis - Chepiga - Pariso
 Gates - Kyle - Oriquen
 Chepiga - Kyle - Oriquen

Results

Scorecard

Judges:
1-Rockell
2-C.Sanchez
3-Weinberger
4-Frig
5-Beckles
6-Calascione
7-Baldantoni
8-Kemper
9-Ourama
10-Feinstein

Comparison to previous Olympia results:
+12 - Juliette Bergmann
+4 - Iris Kyle
Same -  Vickie Gates
+1 - Yaxeni Oriquen-Garcia
-3 - Valentina Chepiga
Same - Lesa Lewis
-1 - Andrulla Blanchette
+11 - Dayana Cadeau
-2 - Brenda Reganot
-6 - Gayle Moher
-3 - Renee Casella

Attended
6th Ms. Olympia attended - Vickie Gates
5th Ms. Olympia attended - Juliette Bergmann, Andrulla Blanchette, and Lesa Lewis
4th Ms. Olympia attended - Valentina Chepiga and Yaxeni Oriquen-Garcia
3rd Ms. Olympia attended - Renee Casella, Iris Kyle, and Brenda Raganot
2nd Ms. Olympia attended - Dayana Cadeau and Gayle Moher
1st Ms. Olympia attended - Fannie Barrios, Angela Debatin, Kim Harris, Betty Pariso, and Joanna Thomas
Previous year Olympia attendees who did not attend - Th-resa Bostick, Denise Hoshor, Cathy LeFrançois, and Jennifer McVicar

Notable events
 Juliette Bergmann won her 1st lightweight and overall Ms. Olympia title. She had not competed since the 1989 World Pro Championships and was considered a dark horse competitor.
 There was controversy over the 2001 Ms. Olympia overall title being awarded to Juliette, with some claiming the move was political. For the past 10 years, she has been a still active International Federation of BodyBuilding and Fitness (IFBB) international judge, working alongside the same judges who decided the outcome of 2001 Ms. Olympia.
 There was no scoresheet for the overall. Jim Manion counted the votes and verbally communicated who the winner was, but nothing was written down. According to Jim, the 8 judges voted for Juliette Bergmann, while 2 judges voted for Iris Kyle.
 This was the only Ms. Olympia where the lightweight Ms. Olympia title winner beat the heavyweight Ms. Olympia title winner to win the overall Ms. Olympia title.
 Iris Kyle won her 1st heavyweight Ms. Olympia title. At the end of the fourth round, both Iris Kyle and Vickie Gates were tied in the scorecard at 43 points. Iris won due to the IFBB tie breaking rule that the discarded highs and lows from all three previous rounds will be used to break the tie, with her getting 12 first place votes, while Vickie got 9 first place votes.
 This was the slimmest margin of victory for a Ms. Olympia heavyweight title.
 This was the only Ms. Olympia where the heavyweight Ms. Olympia title was won through a IFBB tie breaking rule.
 The two emcee of the 2001 Ms. Olympia was Tim Wilkins and Monica Brant.
 The overall posedown song was It's My Life by Bon Jovi.
 The top three heavyweight and top three lightweight posedown song was Tom Sawyer by Rush.

2001 Ms. Olympia Qualified

See also
 2001 Mr. Olympia

References

Ms Olympia, 2001
2001 in bodybuilding
Ms. Olympia
Ms. Olympia
History of female bodybuilding